Anji may refer to:

Places
Hu Prefecture, known as Anji Prefecture between 1225 and 1276
Anji County, in Huzhou, Zhejiang, China
Anji Bridge, or Zhaozhou Bridge, an ancient stone bridge in Hebei, China
Anji, a village in Balasore (Orissa), India

Arts and media

Works
"Anji" (instrumental), a solo acoustic guitar piece composed and recorded by Davey Graham
Anji (film), 2004 Telugu film

Fictional people
Anji Kapoor, a character in the Eighth Doctor Adventures
Anji Mito, a character in the Guilty Gear series of fighting games
Yūkyūzan Anji, a minor character in Rurouni Kenshin

People
Anji Hunter (born 1955), political ally of Tony Blair
Anji Kaneko
Kallam Anji Reddy (Anji Reddy, born 1940), founder of Dr. Reddy's Laboratories, a pharmaceutical company
Anji Xtravaganza ( 1960–1993), performer

Other uses
Anji (Ryūkyū), a historical title and rank in the Ryukyu Islands
FC Anji Mahachkala, a football (soccer) club in Russia

See also
Angie (disambiguation)

Japanese masculine given names